Raúl Torrez (born 1975/1976) is an American lawyer and politician from New Mexico. A member of the Democratic Party, Torrez is the Attorney General of New Mexico.

Early life and education
Torrez's father, Presiliano Torrez, was a federal prosecutor and his mother taught Spanish at Sandia Preparatory School. He graduated from Sandia Prep, and then attended Harvard University, where he graduated cum laude with a Bachelor of Arts in government. He earned a Master of Science in international political economy from the London School of Economics, and then worked for the Cesar Chavez Foundation in Los Angeles before attending Stanford Law School, earning his Juris Doctor.

Career 
After graduating from law school in 2005, Torrez became an assistant district attorney in Valencia County, New Mexico. The next year, he took a job in the office of the New Mexico attorney general. In 2008, Torrez was chief counsel to Ben Luján, the speaker of the New Mexico House of Representatives, and then he served as a White House Fellow in the class of 2009–2010 during the presidency of Barack Obama. He returned to Albuquerque to work in the United States attorney's office and operated a solo law firm.

Torrez won the Democratic Party nomination for district attorney of Bernalillo County, New Mexico, in 2016. He won the general election without opposition from a Republican.

Attorney general of New Mexico 
With Hector Balderas unable to run for reelection as New Mexico Attorney General in the 2022 election due to term limits, Torrez announced his candidacy to succeed him in May 2021. Torrez won the Democratic nomination, defeating New Mexico State Auditor Brian Colón, and faced Republican Jeremy Gay. Torrez defeated Gay in the general election.

Personal life
Torrez's wife, Nasha, is also an attorney and is a dean at the University of New Mexico. They have two children.

Electoral history

}

References

External links

Alumni of the London School of Economics
District attorneys in New Mexico
Harvard University alumni
Living people
New Mexico Attorneys General
New Mexico Democrats
Politicians from Albuquerque, New Mexico
Stanford Law School alumni
Year of birth missing (living people)